RTTOV - the fast radiative transfer model for calculations of radiances for satellite infrared or microwave nadir scanning radiometers (see push broom scanner).

Given an atmospheric profile of temperature, variable gas concentrations, cloud and surface properties RTTOV calculates radiances and brightness temperatures. The only mandatory input is water vapour. Optionally ozone, carbon dioxide, nitrous oxide, methane and carbon monoxide can be variable with all other constituents assumed
to be constant.  The range of temperatures and water vapour concentrations over which the optical
depth computations are valid depends on the training datasets which were used.  The spectral range of the RTTOV9.1 model is 3-20 micrometres (500 – 3000 cm-1) in the infrared.

RTTOV  contains forward, tangent linear, adjoint and K (full Jacobian matrices) versions of the model; the latter three modules for variational
assimilation or retrieval applications.

One of several applications of RTTOV are retrievals of brightness temperature and sea surface temperature from Advanced Very High Resolution Radiometer sensor.

FASTEM 
Surface emissivity model which parameterizes surface emissivity. FASTEM2 computes the surface emissivity averaged over all facets representing the surface of the ocean and an effective path correction factor for the down-welling brightness temperature. FASTEM2 is applicable for frequencies between 10 and 220 GHz, for earth incidence angles less than 60 degrees.

See also 
 List of atmospheric radiative transfer codes
 Community Radiative Transfer Model

References 
 Eyre J. R. 1991 A fast radiative transfer model for satellite sounding systems. ECMWF Research Dept. Tech. Memo. 176 (available from the librarian at ECMWF).
 Matricardi, M., F. Chevallier and S. Tjemkes 2001 An improved general fast radiative transfer model for the assimilation of radiance observations. ECMWF Research Dept. Tech. Memo. 345. http://www.ecmwf.int/publications
 Saunders R.W., M. Matricardi and P. Brunel 1999 An Improved Fast Radiative Transfer Model for Assimilation of Satellite Radiance Observations. Quart. J.Royal Meteorol. Soc., 125, 1407-1425.

External links 
 https://nwp-saf.eumetsat.int/site/software/rttov/ RTTOV homepage
 http://research.metoffice.gov.uk/research/interproj/nwpsaf/rtm/rttov_applications/simulated_imagery.html Example use of RTTOV with the Unified Model
 http://cimss.ssec.wisc.edu/itwg/groups/rtwg/fastrt.html Exaplanation of tangent linear, adjoint and K radiative transfer models.

Atmospheric radiative transfer codes
Satellite meteorology